Niwa is a station on Line 10 of the Beijing Subway.

Station Layout 
The station has an underground island platform.

Exits 
There are 4 exits, lettered A1, A2, B, and C1. Exits A1, A2, and C1 are accessible.

References

Beijing Subway stations in Fengtai District